Da-Tong, sometimes called Daye after its principal dialect, is one of the Gan Chinese languages. It is spoken in Daye, in the southeastern part of Hubei province near the Jiangxi border, as well as in Xianning, Jiangyu, Puxin, Chongyang, Tongcheng, Tongshan, and Yangxin in Hubei, as well as in Huarong and bordering areas of eastern Hunan.

Sounds
The Daye variety will be taken as representative.

Consonants

Tones

Citation tones

Gan Chinese